Nives Ahlin (born 14 July 1991) is a Slovenian female handball player who plays for RK Zagorje and the Slovenia national team.

Achievements
Slovenian First League:
Winner: 2009

References
 

   
1991 births
Living people
People from Trbovlje
Slovenian female handball players
Expatriate handball players
Slovenian expatriate sportspeople in Germany
Competitors at the 2018 Mediterranean Games
Mediterranean Games bronze medalists for Slovenia
Mediterranean Games medalists in handball